
Wawaskesy National Park was created north and west of the South Saskatchewan River, north of the city of Medicine Hat in southeastern Alberta, Canada, on May 31, 1922. It was closed on June 24, 1938, and delisted in 1947.

The area was one of many pronghorn reserves created in Alberta and Saskatchewan at that time.

Wawaskesy National Park was one of several national parks created in the Canadian Prairies expressly to protect and regenerate dangerously low populations of bison and pronghorn. Other 'regeneration' parks, also delisted on July 17, 1947, included Buffalo National Park and Nemiskam National Park (both in Alberta) and Menissawok National Park in Saskatchewan.

Wawaskesy is a Cree word for antelope.

With the rebound of pronghorn herds in southern Saskatchewan and Alberta, Wawaskesy was closed in 1938 and title to lands in Wawaskesy National Park automatically reverted to Alberta, in accordance with provisions of the Alberta Natural Resources Act of 1930 and the land was used by area farmers. In 1941 the land was transferred to Canada and included in the Suffield Block for military use. On the 19 June 2003, a portion of the Suffield Block, including areas formerly within Wawaskesy National Park, were designated the Suffield National Wildlife Area.

References

Citations

Bibliography

1947 disestablishments in Alberta
Cypress County
National parks in Alberta
Parks in Alberta
Protected areas established in 1922
South Saskatchewan River
1922 establishments in Alberta
Former national parks of Canada